The Navajo Nation Presidential elections took place on November 7, 2006. Primary elections took place on August 8, 2006. Incumbent President Joe Shirley Jr. was re-elected, defeating 11 candidates, including former New Mexico State senator Lynda Lovejoy.

Major Candidates

Frank Dayish Jr. 
On May 6, 2006, then vice-president of the Navajo Nation Frank Dayish Jr. announced his bid for president at the Shiprock Chapter as 450 concern Diné.

Lynda Lovejoy 
Lynda Lovejoy, a former New Mexico state representative, declared her candidancy on April 1, 2006, at the Crownpoint Chapter House in Crownpoint, New Mexico.

Candidates 

 Calvin Tsosie Yatahey, New Mexico
 Frank Dayish  Shiprock, New Mexico
 Lynda Lovejoy Crownpoint, New Mexico
 Ernest H Begay Rock Point, Arizona
 James Henderson Ganado, Arizona
 Wilbur Nelson 
 Harrison Todichiini Shiprock, New Mexico
 Vern Lee Kirtland, New Mexico
 Joe Shirley Jr. Chinle, Arizona

Primary Elections
Shirley Jr. (Chinle) and Lovejoy (Crownpoint) proceeded to a runoff in November 2007. This was he first time in Navajo government history that a woman made it to the runoff .
Immediately after the first round, Mrs. Lovejoy selected Walter Phelps from Leupp, Arizona as her running mate to challenge Shirley, who picked Navajo Nation Council Delegate Ben Shelly (Thoreau). 

Shirley defeated Loevjoy in the second round by a margin of 4,000. Becoming the first leader of the Navajo nation to be re-elected since Chairman Peter MacDonald.

See also 
 Navajo Nation

References
 Johnson, Natasha Kaye. (2006). Lovejoy enters race (Archived 2009-05-16). The Gallup Independent
 Hassler, Brian. (2007). Dayish campaign begins with rally in Shiprock (Archived 2009-05-16). The Gallup Independent

Navajo Nation presidential
Navajo Nation elections